A playground is an area designed for children to play in.

Playground may also refer to:

Arts, entertainment, and media
 "Playground", an episode of the CBeebies television series Balamory
Playground (2009 film), a 2009 film
Playground (2021 film), a 2021 film
Playground (TV series) (1962), a Canadian television series
Playground, an 2017 action adventure television series by production company Blackpills
Playground (3/3), a public artwork by Tony Smith, in Beverly Gardens Park, Beverly Hills, California
Playground, a novel by 50 Cent

Businesses
Playground Games, a British video game developer
The Playground Theater, Chicago

Music
Playground (Manu Katché album), 2007
Playground (Michel Petrucciani album), 1991
Playground (Steve Kuhn & Sheila Jordan album), 1979
Playground Music Scandinavia, a Scandinavian-based record label
"Playground" (song), a 1991 song by Another Bad Creation